Alexander Molzahn (25 August 1907 – 1 December 1998) was a German cellist and university teacher.

Life 
Born in Frankfurt, Molzahn studied in Berlin with Georg Wille (1869–1958) and Adolf Steiner (1897–1974). He was professor at the Frankfurt University of Music and Performing Arts and taught at the Hoch Conservatory. His students included Maria Kliegel, Jan Diesselhorst and Stephan Breith.

Molzahn died in Frankfurt at the age of 91.

Further reading 
 Zeitzeuge des Musiklebens. Der Frankfurter Cellist Alexander Molzahn wird 90 Jahre alt. Rhein-Main-Zeitung der Frankfurter Allgemeine Zeitung, 25 August 1997 (Artikelanfang)

References

External links 
 
 

German classical cellists
Academic staff of the Frankfurt University of Music and Performing Arts
1907 births
1998 deaths
Musicians from Frankfurt
20th-century classical musicians
20th-century cellists